Regulator of G-protein signaling 16 is a protein that in humans is encoded by the RGS16 gene.

Function 

The protein encoded by this gene belongs to the 'regulator of G protein signaling' family. It inhibits signal transduction by increasing the GTPase activity of G protein alpha subunits. It also may play a role in regulating the kinetics of signaling in the phototransduction cascade.

Interactions 

RGS16 has been shown to interact with GNAQ and GNAI3.

References

Further reading